The word lès (and  with liaison) is an archaic French preposition meaning "near", "next to". Today it occurs only in place names to distinguish places of the same name.

The word lès has two variants: lez and les. The latter should not be confused with the plural definite article les (e.g. les-Bains, "the Baths").

Etymology 
The word lès and its variants derive from late Latin latus, "side".

Examples

Lès 
 Villeneuve-lès-Avignon, near Avignon
 Beaumont-lès-Valence, near Valence
 Saint-Rémy-lès-Chevreuse, near Chevreuse
 Margny-lès-Compiègne, near Compiègne
 Asnières-lès-Dijon, near Dijon
 Fontaine-lès-Dijon, near Dijon
 Hauteville-lès-Dijon, near Dijon
 Neuilly-lès-Dijon, near Dijon
 Perrigny-lès-Dijon, near Dijon
 Plombières-lès-Dijon, near Dijon
 Sennecey-lès-Dijon, near Dijon
 Garges-lès-Gonesse, near Gonesse
 Bonchamp-lès-Laval, near Laval
 Fontaine-lès-Luxeuil, near  Luxeuil-les-Bains
 Sainte-Foy-lès-Lyon, near Lyon
 Montigny-lès-Metz, near Metz
 Saint-Julien-lès-Metz, near Metz
 Flines-lès-Mortagne, near Mortagne-du-Nord 
 Essey-lès-Nancy, near Nancy
 Vandœuvre-lès-Nancy, near Nancy
 Saulxures-lès-Nancy, near Nancy
 Villers-lès-Nancy, near Nancy
 Déville-lès-Rouen, near Rouen
 Sotteville-lès-Rouen, near Rouen
 Nieul-lès-Saintes, near Saintes
 Chambray-lès-Tours, near Tours
 Joué-lès-Tours, near Tours
 Saint-Martin-lès-Seyne, near Seyne
 Bourg-lès-Valence, near Valence
 Béning-lès-Saint-Avold, near Saint-Avold
 Savigny-lès-Beaune, near Beaune
 …

Lez 
 Auchy-lez-Orchies, near Orchies
 Aulnoy-lez-Valenciennes, near Valenciennes
 Bougy-lez-Neuville, near Neuville-aux-Bois
 Bruille-lez-Marchiennes, near Marchiennes
 Flines-lez-Raches, near Râches
 Hallennes-lez-Haubourdin, near Haubourdin
 Houdain-lez-Bavay, near Bavay
 Lambres-lez-Douai, near Douai
 Lys-lez-Lannoy, near Lannoy
 Marquette-lez-Lille, near Lille
 Mézières-lez-Cléry, near Cléry
 Nissan-lez-Enserune, near Enserune
 Poilly-lez-Gien, near Gien
 Sailly-lez-Cambrai, near Cambrai
 Sailly-lez-Lannoy, near Lannoy
 Saint-André-lez-Lille, near Lille
 Saint-Hilaire-lez-Cambrai, near Cambrai
 Tilloy-lez-Cambrai, near Cambrai
 Tilloy-lez-Marchiennes, near Marchiennes
 Villy-lez-Falaise, near Falaise
 …

Les 

 Avesnes-les-Aubert, near Aubert
 Châteauneuf-les-Martigues, near Martigues
 Chorey-les-Beaune, near Beaune
 La Queue-les-Yvelines, near (the historical region of) Yvelines
 Villars-les-Dombes, near Dombes

References

Toponymy